The 1990 Davis Cup World Group Qualifying Round was held from 21 to 23 September. They were the main play-offs of the 1990 Davis Cup. The winners of the playoffs advanced to the 1991 Davis Cup World Group, and the losers were relegated to their respective Zonal Regions I.

Teams
Bold indicates team had qualified for the 1991 Davis Cup World Group.

From World Group

 
 
 
 
 
 
 
 

 From Americas Group I

 
 

 From Asia/Oceania Group I

 
 

 From Europe/Africa Group I

Results summary
Date: 21–23 September

The eight losing teams in the World Group first round ties and eight winners of the Zonal Group I final round ties competed in the World Group Qualifying Round for spots in the 1991 World Group.

Qualifying results

Belgium vs. South Korea

Israel vs. China

Canada vs. Netherlands

Soviet Union vs. Spain

Sweden vs. Finland

Great Britain vs. France

Mexico vs. Uruguay

Yugoslavia vs. Switzerland

References

External links
Davis Cup Official Website

World Group Qualifying Round